Sarileru Neekevvaru is a 2020 Indian Telugu-language action comedy film written and directed by Anil Ravipudi. It is produced by Sri Venkateswara Creations, G. Mahesh Babu Entertainment and AK Entertainments. The film stars Mahesh Babu, Rashmika Mandanna and Vijayashanti while Prakash Raj and Rajendra Prasad play supporting roles. Devi Sri Prasad composed the music while R. Rathnavelu handled the cinematography.

Production began on 31 May 2019 in Hyderabad. Shooting began on 5 July 2019 at Kashmir and lasted till mid-November 2019. The film released on 11 January 2020 on 2050 screens worldwide coinciding with Sankranti. Produced on a budget of 75 crore, upon release, it received praise for its humor, performances, cinematography, and action sequences, but criticism aimed at screenplay, story and excessive length, and the film was commercially successful grossing more than 196 crore worldwide. According to box-office tracking portal Box Office Mojo, the film has grossed 24.39 million worldwide.

Plot 
Ajay Krishna is a Major in Para SF of the Indian Army, where another person, also named Ajay joins his regiment (Parachute Regiment). During a shootout in a rescue operation, Ajay gets severely injured. Ajay's Brigadier sends Ajay Krishna and his colleague Siva Prasad to inform the news to Ajay's family by ensuring that Ajay's sister's wedding preparations are not disturbed. On the way to Kurnool on a train, they come across Samskruthi, who is an irritating-comic girl. Samskruthi sees Ajay Krishna and falls in love with him. She tries to impress Ajay unusually, but to no avail.

In Kurnool, Ajay's mother, Bharathi went into hiding with her family to escape from MLA Yeddula Nagendra. When they are caught by Nagendra's men who threaten to kill them, Ajay Krishna arrives and thrashes the men with a warning that he would deal with Nagendra in the same way. Nagendra's main henchman narrates this to Nagendra. Meanwhile, Bharathi reveals to Ajay Krishna that she lodged a case against Nagendra for planning the murder of her brother's son, which was covered up as a suicide. When Nagendra threatens her to withdraw the case, she stood her ground.

Consequently, Bharathi is suspended from the college on the allegation of leaking the exam paper and her daughter's marriage gets called off. Ajay Krishna, along with Bharathi leaves for Nagendra's house and challenges him, stating that he will change him into a responsible citizen, by making him surrender after fetching all the evidence. Ajay Krishna learns that Nagendra has been involved in a scam through Ramakrishna, a government officer, who along with a bank officer (Bharathi's brother's son) tried to uncover the scam with the help of a techie, who works in Nagendra Technologies (which is founded by Nagendra and is running his scams).

At the same time, Ajay Krishna re-arranges Bharathi's daughter's marriage with the same person. Meanwhile, Ajay is declared dead and Ajay Krishna informs the family after the wedding. After performing his last rites, Ajay Krishna and Prasad decide to return to Kashmir, while Ajay Krishna also accepts Samskruthi's proposal in between. Despite gathering the evidence, Ajay Krishna spares Nagendra from being jailed as he might use sympathy to leave prison and resume his corrupt activities. Instead, Ajay Krishna tells Nagendra that he is appointed to the Indian Army so that he will be disciplined and lead an honest life thereafter. Three months later, Nagendra is a reformed leader who believes in discipline and respects everyone and Ajay Krishna is marrying Samskruthi.

Cast

Production

Development 
After many speculations Mahesh Babu was announced as a lead hero with movie name titled as Sarileru Neekevvaru. Opening ceremony of the movie was conducted on May 31, 2019.

Casting 
Rashmika Mandanna was signed to play the leading lady in the movie opposite Mahesh Babu. Vijayashanti was signed in for this film, which marked her comeback after 13 years. Tamannaah was signed in for a party song. The film also marks the comeback of Sangeetha and Bandla Ganesh into movies after many years.

Filming 
The first schedule was shot in Kashmir from July 5 to July 20, 2019. On 8 November 2019, with the Kerala schedule the talkie part of the film wrapped up.

Music

The music is composed by Devi Sri Prasad, collaborating with Mahesh Babu for the fifth time and with Anil Ravipudi for the second time after F2: Fun and Frustration. The lyrics were written by Devi Sri Prasad, Sri Mani and Ramajogayya Sastry. Composer Devi worked with a special orchestra in Europe for recording the film's soundtrack and score. The makers announced that the film features five songs and all of them will be released as singles, on five consecutive Mondays of the December month. The hashtag #MassMBMondays was trending on social media.

The first single track titled "Mind Block" was released on 2 December 2019, which was sung by Ranina Reddy with Blaaze singing the rap versions. Devi recorded this song while he was recording two other songs for his upcoming two films, on the same day. The second single track "Suryudivo Chandrudivo" was released on 9 December 2019, which was rendered by B Praak. The song resembles numbers, like "Idhe Kadha Nee Katha" from Maharshi (2019) and "Srimanthuda" from Srimanthudu (2015), which were composed by Devi Sri Prasad. The lyrics talk about the protagonist's kindness and greatness. The third single track "He's So Cute" was released on 16 December 2019, which was sung by Madhu Priya. It is termed as a teasing-romantic number. The fourth single "Sarileru Neekkevvaru Anthem" was released on 23 December 2019. Sung by Shankar Mahadevan, it features an orchestra from Europe, which recorded the film's score. The fifth single track "Daang Daang" was released on 30 December 2019, which was sung by Nakash Aziz and Lavita Lobo. The full album was released on 5 January 2020.

Release

Home media 
The satellite rights of the film were sold to Gemini TV, which premiered it on 25 March 2020 for the first time on eve of Ugadi and in its first Television premier movie recorded a TRP of 23.4. The film's digital rights were acquired by Amazon Prime Video and made available for streaming since 1 March 2020.

Dubbed versions 
The film was dubbed and released in Tamil as Ivanukku Sariyana Aal Illai in 2020. The Tamil version was released across 200 plus theaters in Tamil Nadu. The Hindi dubbed version titled Sarileru was directly premiered on Goldmines TV channel on 15 August 2022. The film was also dubbed and released in Kannada as Major Ajay Krishna and in Malayalam as Krishnan.

Reception

Critical reception

India 
The Times of India critic Neeshita Nyayapati, rated the film 3/5 stars and stated, "Sarileru Neekevvaru definitely has its moments but Anil Ravipudi’s bloated narrative that tries too hard." On performances, Nyayapati noted that Babu did a "good job of playing a man who will serve the country, crack jokes and protect," while also appreciating Vijayashanthi's role. She felt that DSP's music was "okay" and action by Ram-Lakshman was "engaging", but Ratnavelu's cinematography was "unfortunately overshadowed by subpar VFX shots." The editor of India Today, Janani K, rated the film 2/5 stars and wrote, "Mahesh Babu film is utterly disappointing." She stated that "Screenplay is replete with disjointed stories that are forced together." Janani also criticized the fake rape scene in the film, "The audacity to involve the heroine’s mother in faking a rape scene should be called out," she added.

First post editor Hemanth Kumar rated the film 3.25/5 stars and stated: "Mahesh Babu hits it out of the park in Anil Ravipudi's fine blend of heroism and comedy." In a review for The Indian express, Manoj Kumar rated the film 3.5/5 stars and wrote "Mahesh Babu shines in mind bending popcorn fare." Sify gave the film 3/5 and called it a "A commercial action-entertainer." Sangeetha Devi of The Hindu wrote "Mahesh Babu's film is a partly entertaining mixed bag." A reviewer of The Hans India rated the film 3/5 stars and wrote, "The movie will be like an eye feast for the audience who have been waiting to see Mahesh Babu in a complete entertaining role"

Overseas 
Nagarjuna Rao of Gulf News felt that Mahesh Babu has nothing to offer and quoted that "Story about an Army Major loses the plot and veers into inane comedy. The less said about Rashmika the better. She’s been reduced to a dumb femme who swoons at the sight of Mahesh and mouths her catchphrase ‘Neeku artham autunda?’"

Box office 
Sarileru Neekevvaru on the opening day collected  gross, beating Mahesh Babu's previous best Maharshi  gross worldwide.
After a run of 50 days, the film grossed more than ₹2 billion (US$38 million) at worldwide box office, becoming on the one of the highest-grossing Telugu films.

Domestic
Collecting over  share in Telugu states in 10 days.

Overseas 
At the USA box office movie collected 759,000 through premiere shows. On the opening day movie collected  236,754 in Australia,  20,757 in New Zealand and  55,234 in United Kingdom and in two days the movie collected 1.31 million in United States of America. In three days the movie collected 6,454 (457,000) from Canada, 1,624,974 (115.1 million) from USA and 70,689 (6.51 million) from UK. In nine days the movie collected 2 million (142.1 million) from USA, 349,258 (17.1 million) from Australia 96,218 (8.88 million) from UK and 35,566 (1.67 million) from New Zealand. And it crossed over $2.3 million in United States and marked as 3rd film to collect $2 million in Mahesh Babu's career after Srimanthudu and Bharat Ane Nenu.

Accolades

Notes

References

External links 
 
 

2020 films
2020s Telugu-language films
Films directed by Anil Ravipudi
Films scored by Devi Sri Prasad
Films shot at Ramoji Film City
Films shot in Jammu and Kashmir
Indian action comedy films
Indian Army in films
2020s masala films
2020 action comedy films
Films set in Andhra Pradesh
Films set in Kurnool
Sri Venkateswara Creations films